Abel Ignacio Cuevas Melo (born 28 March 1965) is a Mexican politician from the National Action Party. He has served as Deputy of the LVIII and LX Legislatures of the Mexican Congress representing Veracruz.

References

1965 births
Living people
Politicians from Veracruz
National Action Party (Mexico) politicians
20th-century Mexican politicians
21st-century Mexican politicians
People from Coatepec, Veracruz
Universidad de las Américas Puebla alumni
Members of the Congress of Veracruz
Deputies of the LX Legislature of Mexico
Members of the Chamber of Deputies (Mexico) for Veracruz